Hevel Shalom (lit. Shalom region) is an area in the western Negev desert close to Israel's border with the Gaza Strip and Egypt's Sinai. This area was elected to be substitutive area for evacuees from Yamit.

Villages
Villages in Hevel Shalom are mostly organised as moshavim, though they include some kibbutzim as well as one community settlement. All settlements are administered by the Eshkol Regional Council.

Avshalom
Bnei Netzarim
Dekel
Holit
Kerem Shalom
Peri Gan
Sde Avraham
Sufa
Talmei Yosef
Yated
Yevul

Holit, Sufa, and Talmei Yosef were settled by evacuees from Yamit.

References

Regions of Israel
Eshkol Regional Council
Geography of Southern District (Israel)